The Second Amendment to the Constitution of Pakistan became a part of the Constitution of Pakistan on September 7, 1974 under the Government of Prime Minister Zulfiqar Ali Bhutto. It declared that Ahmadis were non-Muslims. It also made way for the establishment of a centralized citizen registry.

Article 30 
Under Article 30 of the Second Amendment of the constitution of Pakistan to perform identification and maintain the statistical database of the citizens of Pakistan. It was stipulated that every person should have a state-issued ID. This set the basis of Pakistans National Identity Card (NIC) system.

Article 260(3) 
In the constitution and all enactments and other legal instruments, unless there is anything repugnant in the subject or context,-
(a)  "Muslim" means a person who believes in the unity and oneness of Almighty Allah, in the absolute and unqualified finality of the Prophethood of Muhammad (peace be upon Him), the last of the Prophets, and does not believe in, or recognize as a prophet or religious reformer, any person who claimed or claims to be a prophet, in any sense of the word or of any description whatsoever, after Muhammad (Peace be upon Him); and
(b)  "non-Muslim" means a person who is not a Muslim and includes a person belonging to the Christian, Hindu, Sikh, Buddhist or Parsi community, a person of the Qadiani group or the Lahori group (who call themselves 'Ahmedis' or by another name), or a Bahai, and a person belonging to any of the scheduled castes.

See also
 Ordinance XX

References

02
Government of Zulfikar Ali Bhutto
Ahmadiyya in Pakistan
Persecution of Ahmadis in Pakistan